Part Five (Part V) of the Constitution of Albania is the fifth of eighteen parts.
Titled The Council of Ministers, it consists of 13 articles.

The Council of Ministers

References

5